The Krankies Klub was the Krankies' first solo attempt at a children's television show since Crackerjack.

References 

1982 British television series debuts
1984 British television series endings
ITV children's television shows
1980s British children's television series